Antonie Nedošinská (26 June 1885 – 17 July 1950) was a Czechoslovak film actress. She appeared in 89 films between 1916 and 1947.

Selected filmography
 The Lantern (1925)
 Falešná kočička aneb Když si žena umíní (1926)
 Kainovo znamení (1928)
 Street Acquaintances (1929)
 Chudá holka (1930)
 The Last Bohemian (1931)
 The Ideal Schoolmaster (1932)
 The Ruined Shopkeeper (1933)
 Camel Through the Eye of a Needle (1936)
 Irca's Romance (1936)
 The Merry Wives (1938)
 Dívka v modrém (1940)
 In the Still of the Night (1941)
 Capek's Tales (1947)

References

External links
 
 

1885 births
1950 deaths
Czechoslovak actresses